Ballet Now is an American documentary film directed by Steven Cantor that premiered on July 20, 2018 on Hulu.

Premise
Ballet Now provides "an unfiltered look into the world of ballet through the eyes of New York City Ballet’s prima ballerina Tiler Peck – the first woman to curate The Music Center’s famed Ballet NOW program in Los Angeles."

Production
On October 12, 2017, it was announced that Hulu had greenlit a feature documentary from director Steven Cantor to be produced Paul Allen, Tiler Peck, and Elisabeth Moss and that it was already in production. Cantor and Jamie Schutz were expected to as co-producers. Production companies involved with the then-untitled film included Vulcan Productions and Stick Figure Productions.

Release

Marketing
On June 1, 2018, Hulu released an exclusive clip from the film.

Premiere
On June 4, 2018, the film held its world premiere during the annual Seattle International Film Festival in Seattle, Washington.

See also
List of original programs distributed by Hulu

References

External links
  at Hulu

2018 documentary films
American documentary films
Hulu original films
2010s English-language films
Films directed by Steven Cantor
2010s American films
English-language documentary films